Tara Sharma (born 11 January 1977) is a British actress, entrepreneur, creator, co-producer and host of The Tara Sharma Show. She is the daughter of authors Partap Sharma and Susan Sharma. She made her bollywood debut in Anupam Kher directorial debut Om Jai Jagadish in 2002. Then she went onto star in various commercially and critically hit films like Masti (2004), Page 3 (2005), Khosla Ka Ghosla (2006), Maharathi (2008), Mumbai Cutting (2009), Dulha Mil Gaya (2010) and Kadakh (2019). Apart from Hindi films, she has appeared in english television shows and english films like Raven: The Secret Temple (2007) and The Other End of the Line (2008).

Early life and education
Tara was born to an Indian author and playwright Partap Sharma and British artist and author Susan Sharma. She studied at the Bombay International School and the United World College of the Adriatic, Italy. Thereafter, she completed her B.Sc in Management at the London School of Economics.

Career
After graduating from LSE, Sharma was a financial consultant at Citibank and Accenture. She appeared in advertisements for Lakme, Garnier, Liril, and Pepsi, the latter included a commercial with Shah Rukh Khan which proved to be a stepping stone into movies.

She debuted in Anupam Kher's Om Jai Jagadish, followed by Khosla Ka Ghosla, Page 3, Saaya, and Masti.

Sharma creates, co-produces and hosts The Tara Sharma Show, a multi-platform show to discuss topical family, parenting, women's and children's issues, with a view to bringing about positive change. The show has completed five seasons having aired on Pogo, NDTV Imagine, Colors, Nickelodeon and Star World.  The show is also available to view on her social media platforms YouTube, Facebook and Instagram.

Personal life
She married media entrepreneur Roopak Saluja in November 2007. They have two children, Zen and Kai.

Filmography

Film

Television

References

External links

The Tara Sharma Show
Tara Sharma interview with impactmania 

Living people
1977 births
Actresses from London
British emigrants to India
Actresses from Mumbai
British film actresses
British voice actresses
British people of Indian descent
British actresses of Indian descent
Actresses in Hindi cinema
British expatriate actresses in India
European actresses in India
Actresses of European descent in Indian films
Alumni of the London School of Economics
People educated at a United World College
21st-century British actresses